The Adventures of Portland Bill is a British stop motion animated children's television series made in 1983. It is set in a fictional lighthouse on the Guillemot Rock, just off the coast from the fictional village of McGuillycuddy. Norman Rossington provides the voice of all the characters, with Portland Bill the principal keeper acting as the narrator of each episode.

Characters
Most of its characters were named after British Sea Areas and coastal weather stations and other words that occur in shipping forecasts:

These live in the lighthouse:
Portland Bill: Principal lighthouse keeper
Ross and Cromarty (see also Ross and Cromarty):  his assistants
Dogger: his dog

The rest of the characters live elsewhere:
Fastnet: fisherman, lives on the island
Mrs. Lundy: owns cottage on mainland
Grandma Tiree: makes oatcakes for the lighthousemen
Inspector Ronaldsway: belongs to the lighthouse service
Finisterre: owns a croft
Eddie Stone: owns the village shop; also is the village's milkman, mayor, postman, meter-reader and policeman.
Young Gail: lives in McGuillycuddy

Places
McGuillycuddy: a village on the mainland overlooking the lighthouse island: named after the real MacGillycuddy's Reeks in Ireland

Location

The idea was originated by John Grace and submitted to the competition 'Maritime England'. Most of the characters are named after the areas of the UK Shipping Forecast. Grandma Tiree and Inspector Ronaldsway are named after automatic weather stations and “Gail” is named after the high winds frequently forecast.  The submission won the prize and was picked up by Graham Clutterbuck at FilmFair who went on to commission two series for ITV.  At the time, John Grace and Mik Parsons were colleagues teaching in the Graphic Design Department at Leicester Polytechnic (now DeMontfort University).  They collaborated on the music and song content with Mik Parsons recording all the songs on his 4-track cassette based Tascam Portastudio.

Boats
The Puffin: rowboat, belongs to Portland Bill.
The Kipper: used by Eddie Stone and Inspector Ronaldsway.

Animals
Flotsam, Jetsam: two sheep
Boulmer: bull

Credits
Series 1
Originated by: John Grace
Director of Animation: Barry Leith
Designed by: John Grace, Barry Leith
Assistant Animators: Humphrey Leadbitter, Heather Boucher
Model Makers: Martin Cheek, Gordon Tait, Linda Thodesen
Music by: John Grace, Mik Parsons
Editor: Robert Dunbar
Assistant Editor: Andi Sloss
Production Coordinator: Barrie Edwards
Stories Adapted for TV by: Ian Sachs
Executive Producer: Graham Clutterbuck
John Grace/FilmFair Ltd MCMLXXXIII

Series 2
Originated by: John Grace
Director of Animation: Humphrey Leadbitter
Designed by: John Grace, Barry Leith
Assistant Animator: Martin Cheek
Model Makers: Martin Cheek, Jo Pierpoint White, Gordon Tait
Music by: John Grace, Mik Parsons
Lighting by: Ted Martin
Edited by: Andrew Sloss
Assisted by: Richard Ireland
Producer: Barrie Edwards
Production Assistant: Mark Woodroffe
Executive Producer: Graham Clutterbuck
John Grace/FilmFair Ltd MCMLXXXVI

Transmission guide

Series 1
13 editions from 4 October 1983 – 3 January 1984 (aired on Tuesdays)
Changeable Weather (4 October 1983) – When Ross and Cromarty's efforts to paint the lighthouse end in slapstick fun, they conjure up rain and snow effects to keep Portland Bill inside.
The Tourists (4 October 1983) – Portland Bill visits McGuillycuddy, while there he helps his friend Eddie Stone and makes the tourists' day trip a memorable one.
The Fishing Match (11 October 1983) – When Ross and Cromarty stage a fishing match they catch more than they bargained for.
The Seaweed Clock (11 October 1983) – How does Portland Bill manage to tell the time by his seaweed clock?
Portland Bill's Busy Day (18 October 1983) – Portland Bill has a day off on the mainland and manages to help all his friends with their jobs.
The Sea Monster (18 October 1983) – Laughter on the night watch when Ross and Cromarty find a sea monster in the living room.
Bedtime For Cromarty (25 October 1983) – Portland Bill recommends an effective but most unusual remedy for Cromarty's hiccups.
The Birthday Surprise (25 October 1983) – Eddie Stone's delivery day has a surprise in store for him at the lighthouse on the Guillemot Rock.
The Jam Session (1 November 1983) – Cromarty and Finisterre's unexpected jam session in the lighthouse turns into musical mayhem when Portland Bill joins in on the bagpipes.
An Inspector Calls (1 November 1983) – The assistant keepers do everything wrong when the lighthouse inspector calls but Portland Bill is pleased with his final report.
Important Message (8 November 1983) – A misunderstood semaphore message results in a slap-up tea for the lighthouse keepers.
Buried Treasure (8 November 1983) – Cromarty finds more than he bargained for when he embarks on a treasure hunt in the village of McGuillycuddy.
Atmospheric Interference (15 November 1983) – Cromarty's weather forecasting kit comes in handy on the day of the cup final.
Dogger's Best Trick (15 November 1983) – When the water pipe in McGuillycuddy is threatening to burst, Dogger the dog manages to save the day but he takes the sausages when he tries to get Eddie Stone's attention.
A Knot For Everything (22 November 1983) – Portland Bill's ability to tie all sorts of knots is tested on his visit to McGuillycuddy.
The Wind Powered Vacuum Cleaner (22 November 1983) – Cromarty invents a wind powered vacuum cleaner to speed up spring cleaning in the lighthouse. All is fine until the wind changes direction.
The Good News Storm (29 November 1983) – Ross and Cromarty find out that even the fiercest storm can be good news on the Guillemot Rock.
The Whistling Kettle (29 November 1983) – A whistling kettle helps Eddie Stone to pacify a runaway bull.
Baking Day (6 December 1983) – Cromarty's expertise as a chef comes into question on the day that Eddie Stone's boat loses its anchor.
Bird Watching (6 December 1983) – A penguin's visit to the lighthouse has chaotic results, but Ross and Cromarty are too busy bird-watching to notice.
The Lost Key (13 December 1983) – The keepers search high and low for a special lighthouse key. Valencia the parrot and Dogger the dog know where it is all the time.
Sick As A Parrot (13 December 1983) – It's riotous laughter for all when Cromarty and Valencia the parrot find that they have something in common.
Portland Bill And The Mermaid (20 December 1983) – Ross and Cromarty refuse to believe in mermaids until they meet one face to face.
The Big Shopping List (20 December 1983) – The order from the oil rig is the biggest that Eddie Stone has ever had but he is able to fill it with some help from Portland Bill.
The Day The Sea Froze (3 January 1984) – The lighthouse keepers use spectacular methods to keep warm on the day that the sea freezes around the Guillemot Rock.
The Fishermen's Ball (3 January 1984) – Poster pasting ends in fun and laughter at the fishermen's ball.

Series 2
12 editions from 9 April 1986 – 25 June 1986 (aired on Wednesdays)
The Guided Tour (9 April 1986) – Ross and Cromarty await the Lighthouse Inspector only to find they're besieged by tourists.
Beach Combers (9 April 1986) – Miss Shannon so longs to own her own pottery, what can Portland Bill do to help?
The Foggy Day (16 April 1986) – Bill jokes that the incoming fog will bring King Neptune to the lighthouse.
Kite Flying (16 April 1986) – It's a windy day in the village of McGuillycuddy, ideal kite flying weather.
Football Pie (23 April 1986) – After mistaking a pumpkin for a football, Ross and Cromarty have a surprise treat for tea.
Gone Fishing (23 April 1986) – Ross and Cromarty have a fishing match but what they catch certainly isn't edible.
Bad Dogger (30 April 1986) – Dogger is acting very strangely, barking at everybody, what can be wrong?
The Garden Party (30 April 1986) – Bill invites all his friends to a Garden Party at the lighthouse, but he doesn't have a garden.
A Quiet Night (7 May 1986) – Being on nightwatch at the Lighthouse can be a bit boring, except when something goes wrong.
The Phantom Piper (7 May 1986) – Strange music is heard in the village, could the Legend Of The Phantom Piper be true.
Forty Winks (14 May 1986) – Eddie Stone is so tired he falls asleep, but he's at sea and there's a storm blowing.
Last Jam Tart (14 May 1986) – Whoever finishes their work first gets the last Jam Tart, but who will it be?
Penguins (21 May 1986) – Bill's orders to Ross are, Don't feed the penguins, but surely one little biscuit can't hurt.
Super Sale (21 May 1986) – Eddie Stone decides to have a Super Sale at his shop.
Painting The Lighthouse (28 May 1986) – Cromarty tries his hand at being an artist.
Hot Gossip (28 May 1986) – A Royal welcome is in store for Valencia the parrot, when she's mistaken for a Princess.
Good Ideas (4 June 1986) – Cromarty has a list of chores to do before Bill and Ross get back from the mainland.
Sky High (4 June 1986) – Ross and Cromarty take a ride of a lifetime when they open a package they shouldn't.
Weather Forecast (11 June 1986) – Whatever day Cromarty chooses to do the washing it always seems to rain.
Dogger To The Rescue (11 June 1986) – Dogger hates having a bath, but loves a swim in the sea, which is just as well for Bill.
St. Bozo's Treasure (18 June 1986) – Ross and Cromarty go in search of St. Bozo's Treasure, but treasure isn't exactly what they find.
The Runaway Sheep (18 June 1986) – Chaos is caused the day Finisterre's sheep escape in the village.
The Sea Chest (25 June 1986) – When Ross and Cromarty have a fishing match, Cromarty decides to cheat.
The Big Catch (25 June 1986) – Fastnet bets he can catch more in his fishing nets than Bill, but can he?

Trivia
The series was narrated by actor of Spooner's Patch and Big Jim and the Figaro Club, Norman Rossington.
The show aired on ABC in Australia (10 August 1987 – 28 February 1992). However, whereas two episodes were shown back-to-back in the UK, each episode was screened individually in Australia. The show was also screened in New Zealand on TV One starting in the same year. In Canada the series aired on Knowledge Network during the late 1980s.
Series 1 of the show aired in Greece on the Channel 2 of Hellenic National Television (known as ERT2) in 1984. It was dubbed in Greek. In Iran the series was aired on IRIB dubbed in Persian. 
Each broadcast and the series 1 episodes that were featured on the VHS releases consisted of two episodes back-to-back connected by a song. Unfortunately, the songs are not featured on the DVD releases, but one song, 'Eddie's Song' has been uploaded to YouTube. In 2021, one of the show's musicians Mik Parsons uploaded four of the songs to YouTube.

VHS releases

FilmFair Fun had released one single video containing five double-length stories from the first series on it:

Sometime during 1988, FilmFair Fun had also released an extended single video with six double-length stories from the first series on it:

Snapdragon Video released a collection of 10 Portland Bill stories from the second series:

In the 1990s on 17 July 1995, Castle Communications Plc released three videos with four double-length episodes each:

DVD Releases
Abbey Home Media released two DVDs containing twenty four episodes from the first season. The episodes are presented in single bill format and do not include the songs that were originally featured between two episodes each.
{| class="wikitable" style="text-align:center; width:100%;"
! width="21%" | Title
! style="width:11%;"  | Release date
! width="51%" | Episodes
|-
| The Adventures Of Portland Bill:Changeable Weather(AHEDVD 3160)| 12 June 2006
| 
|-
| The Adventures Of Portland Bill:Atmospheric Interference(AHEDVD 3219)
| 26 March 2007
| 
|}

See also
 Gran (1983)
 Postman Pat'' (1981)

External links
The Adventures of Portland Bill at the Big Cartoon DataBase
The Adventures of Portland Bill at ClassicKidsTV.co.uk

The Adventures of Portland Bill at Little Gems
The Adventures of Portland Bill at Toonhound

1983 British television series debuts
1986 British television series endings
1980s British children's television series
1980s British animated television series
British children's animated adventure television series
ITV children's television shows
Isle of Portland
Works set in lighthouses
British stop-motion animated television series
Television series by FilmFair
Television series by DHX Media
English-language television shows
Television series by ITV Studios
Australian Broadcasting Corporation original programming
Television shows produced by Granada Television